NBRS Financial Bank was a bank in Maryland, United States of America.

It was founded in 1873 as The Evans and Wood Bank. it was chartered as a national bank on July 1, 1880 under the name The National Bank of Rising Sun. It became a state chartered bank in 2002, again changing its name to NBRS Financial (abbreviation of the bank's name), opening branches: : Aberdeen (12/28/2004), Elkton (6/3/2005), Havre De Grace (1/18/2000), Peach Bottom (10/3/1973), Rising Sun 7/1/1880), Street (7/18/2003). As of June 30, 2014, they had 54 full-time employees at their six offices. During the bank's height, the FDIC reports they had 75 full-time employees.

References

Banks based in Maryland
Defunct banks of the United States